Santo Banto is a 1976 Punjabi film starring Dharmendra.

Cast 
 Veerendra ... Jeeta
 Aruna Irani ... Santo/Banto (dual role)
 Shatrughan Sinha ... Karma (special appearance)
 Dharmendra ... Cameo appearance
 Seema Kapoor ... Bhajni
 Mehar Mittal ... Laala Shauki Ram
 Ajit Singh Deol ... Jagga Bhalwaan
 Darshan Bagga ... Jora (as Darshan Singh)
 Shetty ... Kaalu Smuggler 
 Narinder Biba ... Special appearance in Ladies Sangeet- Boliyan
 Tun Tun ... Banarsi's wife

References

External links
 

1976 films
Punjabi-language Indian films
1970s Punjabi-language films